Mesophleps silacella, the straw crest, is a moth of the family Gelechiidae. It is found in Europe, Turkey and Algeria.

The wingspan is 9–17 mm. The forewings are pale yellow, the distal half of the costa with brown and sometimes with a black edge. Adults have been recorded on the wing in June.

The larvae feed on Helianthemum species (including Helianthemum nummularium and Helianthemum tuberosum) and Fumana procumbens. The larvae have been described as pale reddish with a honey yellow head. They have been recorded in April, May, June and August.

References

Moths described in 1796
Mesophleps
Moths of Europe
Moths of Réunion
Moths of Africa